Sigma 60mm F2.8 DN Art lens is a standard prime lens for Sony E and Micro Four-Thirds mounts, announced by Sigma on January 29, 2013. It was only the third interchangeable lens brought to market by Sigma for a digital mirrorless camera, and the second time doing so (the first two lenses were released together in January 2012).

Build quality
The lens showcases a glossy black (or silver) plastic exterior with the Sigma Art "A" badge on the side of the lens. It features a large manual focus ring and a detachable barrel-type lens hood.

Image quality
The optics are exceptionally sharp across the frame from its maximum aperture of f/2.8. It has very little distortion, chromatic aberration, or vignetting.

Colour rendition is very good and neutral. Also it has a good resistance to lens flare.

See also
 List of third-party E-mount lenses
 List of Micro Four Thirds lenses

References

60
Camera lenses introduced in 2013
Sigma 60 2.8